Eric Dingus (born March 27, 1995) is an electronic musician and producer from Austin, Texas.

Early life
Eric Dingus was born in 1995 in Austin, Texas. Eric began producing using software from Ableton at the age of 16.

Career
Eric Dingus has worked with popular artists such as Gangsta Boo, Main Attrakionz, Sir Michael Rocks, Shady Blaze, Bones, Xavier Wulf, and Vinny cha$e. He now is very active with Toronto rapper Jimmy Johnson, who is a part of Prime.

On November 17, 2013, Eric Dingus's remix of Worst Behavior by Drake was featured by October's Very Own on their blog.

Dingus co-produced "Now & Forever" with Jimmy Prime on Drake's 2015 mixtape If You're Reading This It's Too Late.

Discography

 Ethereal Depression (2012)
 Instrumentals Vol. 1: Remember 1995 (2012)
 Instrumentals Vol. 2: How Are You Dreaming (2012)
 Post-Suicide Limerence (2013)
 Subliminal Innocence (2013)
 512 (2013)
 Octobers Very Own Presents: HAW - Eric Dingus Mixtape (2014)
 Footage - Mixtape (2014)
 Isolation Dreams - Mixtape (2014)
 Octobers Very Own Presents: HAW2 - Eric Dingus Mixtape (2015)
 Is There In Truth No Beauty (2015)

References

External links
Official website

1995 births
Living people
Musicians from Austin, Texas
American electronic musicians
American experimental musicians
Record producers from Texas
American male musicians